Ariana Savalas is an American actress, singer, songwriter, burlesque performer, and the daughter of actor Telly Savalas. She is a resident headlining performer and emcee for Postmodern Jukebox. She was one of the original members of the group alongside Haley Reinhart, Casey Abrams, Robyn Adele Anderson, and Morgan James.

Savalas tours with the band and has appeared in a number of the group's YouTube videos, two of her videos in the top five most popular videos in the group's history.

She has been called the Dita Von Teese of music, fusing her original music with elements of traditional vaudeville and burlesque. She was described by Las Vegas Magazine as "the musical burlesque queen" and "the mistress of the modern Moulin Rouge".

Early life
Savalas was born in Los Angeles, California, but was raised in Minnesota following her father's death in 1994. She attended an all-girls Catholic convent school in her teenage years before graduating early and moving to London to pursue a career in performance. She studied Shakespeare and acting at the Royal Academy of Dramatic Art in London and is a member of Playhouse West, a repertory theater directed by Jeff Goldblum.

Before turning to burlesque, Savalas toured and recorded in Europe as a pop singer in her teens with European producer Jack White. She made a guest appearance as Bobby Lainsford on the CBS hit drama Criminal Minds in 2010. Savalas began her music career in Los Angeles as a singer/songwriter playing venues on the Sunset Strip, such as the Whisky a Go Go and Hard Rock Cafe.

Career

Debut singles and EP

Savalas' first jazz EP, Sophisticated Lady, was a combination of her original compositions as well as two standards from the Great American Songbook, including the song "Sophisticated Lady" by Duke Ellington, Mitchell Parish, and Irving Mills which she named the record after. Savalas was widely known in the cabaret world headlining in venues such as the New York Friars' Club and Michael Feinstein's late New York cabaret Feinstein's. She was the opening act for saxophone legend Kenny G and has toured the world with 14 time Grammy nominee Dave Koz.

Postmodern Jukebox

Savalas was introduced to Scott Bradlee in 2015 and began collaborating on online videos and touring with the band soon after. They have performed at venues such as Radio City Music Hall, The Greek Theater, and the O2 Academy in London. Savalas was their first female emcee, and hosted the first-ever PMJ PBS special "Postmodern Jukebox: The New Classics".

Burlesque

Savalas began incorporating her own music into live shows, drawing influences from the Weimar Republic era of German Cabaret and the Moulin Rouge. Her 2019 live album, "The Ménage a Tour! Live from Las Vegas" was a showcase of music, songwriting, dance, comedy, and burlesque. Savalas released a single and music video for her original song "Legendary Lover" in early 2020.

The Dead Dance

Savalas released her debut full studio record, The Dead Dance, in early 2020. The album was released exclusively under Cargo Records in Germany and digitally worldwide. The first single, "Memory", features trumpet player Brian Newman.

Discography
 The Dead Dance
 Legendary Lover (single) 
 Sophisticated Lady
 The Ménage a Tour! Live from Las Vegas

Featured with Postmodern Jukebox 
 The Essentials - "No Diggity"
 Swipe Right for Vintage - "Criminal"
 Top Hat on Fleek - "Single Ladies (Put a Ring On It)"
 Selfies on Kodachrome - "Blank Space"
 PBS presents Scott Bradlee's Postmodern Jukebox, The New Classics
 Emoji Antique - "Bad Romance"
 Historical Misappropriation - "No Diggity"
 Swing the Vote - "Pony"
 PMJ is for Lovers - "Blank Space"
 Fake Blues - "Thong Song"
 New Gramaphone, who dis? - "It Wasn't Me"
 Jazz Age Thirst Trap - "Bad Guy" 
 The Essentials II - "All About the Bass"
 33 Resolutions Per Minute'' - "Bye Bye Bye"

References

External links
 Official website

American film actresses
American television actresses
American people of Greek descent
Living people
1987 births
21st-century American actresses
Actresses from Los Angeles
Actresses from Minnesota
Singers from Los Angeles
Singer-songwriters from Minnesota
American jazz singers
American women singer-songwriters
21st-century American singers
American neo-burlesque performers
Alumni of RADA
Jazz musicians from California
Jazz musicians from Minnesota
21st-century American women singers
Singer-songwriters from California